Jean-Pierre Marie Andre Luc Windal (9 December 1936 – 23 August 2009) was a French field hockey player. He competed in the men's tournament at the 1960 Summer Olympics.

References

External links
 

1936 births
2009 deaths
French male field hockey players
Olympic field hockey players of France
Field hockey players at the 1960 Summer Olympics
Field hockey players from Paris